Elegia may refer to:
 The Latin term for "elegy"
 Elegia (moth), a snout moth genus in subfamily Phycitinae
 Elegia (plant), a South African plant genus in family Restionaceae
 , 1979 Polish film directed by Paweł Komorowski
 Elegia (literary club) Nakhodka in 1970
 Elegia (Madetoja)
 "Elegia" (song), by New Order
 , by  Paolo Conte